Swing Set is an EP by Ani Difranco, released July 11, 2000 on Righteous Babe Records.

Track listing
"Swing (Radio Set)" (Ani DiFranco) – 3:57
"Swing (Album Version)" (DiFranco) – 6:13
"To the Teeth (Shoot-Out Remix)" (DiFranco) – 6:12
"Do Re Me (live)" (Woody Guthrie) – 3:12
"When I'm Gone" (Phil Ochs) – 4:20
"Hurricane" (Bob Dylan, Jacques Levy) – 7:11

Personnel
Ani DiFranco – guitar, bass, keyboards, triangle, vocals, bells, sampling, megaphone, drum programming
Daren Hahn – turntables
Jason Mercer – bass
Corey Parker – rapping
Maceo Parker – saxophone
Bo Ramsey – guitar
David Rawlings – guitar
Gillian Welch – backing vocals
Julie Wolf – organ, Wurlitzer

Production
Goat Boy – engineer
Mary Ann Southard – design

References

2000 EPs
Ani DiFranco albums
Righteous Babe EPs